The 1984 United States presidential election in Idaho took place on November 6, 1984. All 50 states and the District of Columbia, were part of the 1984 United States presidential election. State voters chose four electors to the Electoral College, which selected the president and vice president of the United States. Idaho was won by incumbent United States President Ronald Reagan of California, who was running against former Vice President Walter Mondale of Minnesota. Reagan ran for a second time with incumbent Vice President and former C.I.A. Director George H. W. Bush of Texas, and Mondale ran with Representative Geraldine Ferraro of New York, the first major female candidate for the vice presidency.

The presidential election of 1984 was a very partisan election for Idaho, with just under 99 percent of the electorate voting for either the Democratic or Republican parties, and only four parties appearing on the ballot. Every county in the state gave Reagan an outright majority. Reagan's weakest county, and Mondale's best, was Shoshone County, which Reagan won 50.2%-48.3%. It was the only county Reagan did not win by double digits. Reagan's best county was Madison County, which Reagan won 92.9%-6.6%. This was Mondale's worst showing in any county nationwide.

Idaho weighed in for this election as 27.75 percentage points more Republican than the national average and with 72.36 percent of the popular vote, made it Reagan's second strongest state after neighboring Utah.

Reagan won the election in Idaho with a resounding 46 point sweep-out landslide. His 72.36% vote share made it his second-best state in the nation, after neighboring Utah. The Mountain West in general had begun trending Republican in 1952, after having been a swing region that was critical for Democrats' hopes of winning the presidency between 1896 and 1948. In Idaho, this happened relatively quickly; in 1964, Barry Goldwater came within less than 2% of carrying Idaho, his closest near-win in the country. However, the trend accelerated, in Idaho and elsewhere, in 1980, as the incumbent president, Jimmy Carter, had been widely perceived as carrying out a 'war on the West' with his water, energy, and development policies. That year, Reagan exceeded the vote shares Eisenhower had received in 1952 and 1956, and that Nixon had received in 1972, in the Gem State, despite garnering only a bare majority nationally. In 1984, he improved even further, becoming the first (and thus far, the only) nominee of either party to crack 70% in the state since William Jennings Bryan in 1896.

Reagan exhibited strength throughout Idaho. He got over 60% in all six of its most populous counties--Ada (Boise), Canyon (Nampa), Bonneville (Idaho Falls), Bannock (Pocatello), Kootenai (Coeur d'Alene), and Twin Falls (Twin Falls). In four of the six (including Ada, by far the largest), he got over 70%; and in one (Bonneville), he exceeded 80%. Amongst smaller counties, Reagan did particularly well in heavily Mormon southeast and south central Idaho, winning over 90% of the vote in Madison County (his strongest performance in any county in the country), and over 80% in Jefferson, Franklin, Cassia, Clark, Bear Lake, Caribou, Fremont, Minodoka, and Oneida Counties. However, his strength in the state was broad as well as deep; in only one county (Shoshone) did he fail to run up a double-digit margin over Mondale. Mondale's strength, relatively speaking, was concentrated in and around the Silver Valley region; he was able to break 40% only in Benewah, Latah, Nez Perce, Clearwater, and Shoshone Counties. This election is the most recent election in which the winner won every county in Idaho.

Democratic platform
Walter Mondale accepted the Democratic nomination for presidency after pulling narrowly ahead of Senator Gary Hart of Colorado and Rev. Jesse Jackson of Illinois - his main contenders during what would be a very contentious Democratic primary. During the campaign, Mondale was vocal about reduction of government spending, and, in particular, was vocal against heightened military spending on the nuclear arms race against the Soviet Union, which was reaching its peak on both sides in the early 1980s.

Taking a (what was becoming the traditional liberal) stance on the social issues of the day, Mondale advocated for gun control, the right to choose regarding abortion, and strongly opposed the repeal of laws regarding institutionalized prayer in public schools. He also criticized Reagan for his economic marginalization of the poor, stating that Reagan's reelection campaign was "a happy talk campaign," not focused on the real issues at hand.

A very significant political move during this election: the Democratic Party nominated Representative Geraldine Ferraro to run with Mondale as Vice-President. Ferraro is the first female candidate to receive such a nomination in United States history. She said in an interview at the 1984 Democratic National Convention that this action "opened a door which will never be closed again," speaking to the role of women in politics.

Republican platform

By 1984, Reagan was very popular with voters across the nation as the President who saw them out of the economic stagflation of the early and middle 1970's, and into a period of economic stability.

The economic success seen under Reagan was politically accomplished (principally) in two ways. The first was initiation of deep tax cuts for the wealthy, and the second was a wide-spectrum of tax cuts for crude oil production and refinement, namely, with the 1980 Windfall profits tax cuts. These policies were augmented with a call for heightened military spending, the cutting of social welfare programs for the poor, and the increasing of taxes on those making less than $50,000 per year. Collectively called "Reaganomics", these economic policies were established through several pieces of legislation passed between 1980 and 1987.

Some of these new policies also arguably curbed several existing tax loopholes, preferences, and exceptions, but Reaganomics is typically remembered for its trickle down effect of taxing poor Americans more than rich ones. Reaganomics has (along with legislation passed under presidents George H. W. Bush and Bill Clinton) been criticized by many analysts as "setting the stage" for economic troubles in the United States after 2007, such as the Great Recession.

Virtually unopposed during the Republican primaries, Reagan ran on a campaign of furthering his economic policies. Reagan vowed to continue his "war on drugs," passing sweeping legislation after the 1984 election in support of mandatory minimum sentences for drug possession.  Furthermore, taking a (what was becoming the traditional conservative) stance on the social issues of the day, Reagan strongly opposed legislation regarding comprehension of gay marriage, abortion, and (to a lesser extent) environmentalism, regarding the final as simply being bad for business.

Results

Results by county

See also
 United States presidential elections in Idaho
 Presidency of Ronald Reagan

References

Idaho
1984
1984 Idaho elections